Mamerto Urriolagoitía assumed office as the 43rd President of Bolivia on 24 October 1949, and his term was terminated upon his resignation in a self-coup on 16 May 1951. The vice president of Enrique Hertzog, Urriolagoitía had already been serving as acting president since 7 May 1949 but officially took office after Hertzog presented his resignation on 22 October.

Urriolagoitía formed three cabinets during his 18-month presidency, constituting the 123rd to 125th national cabinets of Bolivia. A further two cabinets, constituting the 121st and 122nd national cabinets, were formed while he was still acting president during the term of his predecessor Enrique Hertzog but are generally regarded as his first and second cabinets rather than Hertzog's eight and ninth.

Cabinet Ministers

Gallery

Notes

References

Bibliography 
 

Cabinets of Bolivia
Cabinets established in 1949
Cabinets disestablished in 1951
1949 establishments in Bolivia